Sebastiaan Bornauw (born 22 March 1999) is a Belgian professional footballer who plays as a defender for Bundesliga club VfL Wolfsburg and the Belgium national team.

Club career

Anderlecht
Bornauw made his professional debut for Anderlecht in a 4–1 Belgian Pro League win over Kortrijk on 28 July 2018, at the age of 19 years old. He played the full game. Bornauw would go on to become a key defender for Anderlecht, despite his young age. In total, he played in 24 league games and he scored one goal as a defender for Anderlecht in his debut season.

1. FC Köln
On 6 August 2019, Bornauw joined 1. FC Köln on a five-year deal. He scored his first Bundesliga goal on 20 October 2019 against SC Paderborn. In his first season at 1. FC Köln, Bornauw established himself as a regular starter and became a key player for the club.

VfL Wolfsburg
On 16 July 2021, Köln announced that the club had transferred Bornauw to VfL Wolfsburg, where he signed a contract until 2026.
He scored his first goal for Wolfsburg on 26 February 2022 in a 2–2 draw against Borussia Mönchengladbach.

International career
Bornauw debuted with the Belgium national football team in a 1–1 friendly draw with Ivory Coast on 8 October 2020.

References

External links
 

Living people
1999 births
Association football defenders
Belgian footballers
Belgium international footballers
Belgium under-21 international footballers
Belgium youth international footballers
Belgian expatriate footballers
R.S.C. Anderlecht players
1. FC Köln players
Belgian Pro League players
Bundesliga players
Expatriate footballers in Germany
VfL Wolfsburg players